Josef Pelz von Felinau (24 October 1895 – 15 February 1978) was an Austrian writer who authored many novels and radio plays. He occasionally worked as a screenwriter. His 1936 novel about the sinking of the RMS Titanic served as the basis for the 1943 German anti-British film Titanic, although some of the claims it was based on have been discredited.

Selected filmography
 Just Once a Great Lady (1934)
 A Day Will Come (1934)
 Love, Death and the Devil (1934)

References

Bibliography
 Malte Fiebing. TITANIC (1943): Nazi Germany's version of the disaster. 2012.

External links

1895 births
1978 deaths
20th-century Austrian novelists
Austrian emigrants to Germany
Austrian male screenwriters
People from Sankt Pölten
20th-century Austrian male writers
20th-century Austrian screenwriters